Sulette Damons (born 30 October 1989) is a South African field hockey player. At the 2012 Summer Olympics she competed with the South Africa women's national field hockey team in the women's tournament.  She was also part of the South African team at the 2014 and 2018 Commonwealth Games. She made her debut for the national team in 2010 against Argentina.

References

External links

Living people
1989 births
Field hockey players at the 2012 Summer Olympics
Olympic field hockey players of South Africa
South African female field hockey players
Field hockey players at the 2014 Commonwealth Games
Commonwealth Games competitors for South Africa
People from Graaff-Reinet
Field hockey players at the 2018 Commonwealth Games
Female field hockey forwards
Sportspeople from the Eastern Cape